Clayton Emory Van Alstyne (May 24, 1900 in Stuyvesant, New York – January 5, 1960 in Hudson, New York), was a Major League Baseball pitcher from  to  for the Washington Senators.

See also
List of Major League Baseball players with a home run in their final major league at bat

External links

1900 births
1960 deaths
Washington Senators (1901–1960) players
Major League Baseball pitchers
Baseball players from New York (state)
Pittsfield Hillies players
Albany Senators players
Bridgeport Bears (baseball) players
Birmingham Barons players
Minneapolis Millers (baseball) players
Indianapolis Indians players
Reading Keystones players
People from Stuyvesant, New York
People from Hudson, New York